The list of ship launches in 1736 includes a chronological list of some ships launched in 1736.


References

1736
Ship launches